Maik Machulla (born 9 January 1977) is a German retired handball player and current coach of SG Flensburg-Handewitt.

References 

1977 births
Living people
German handball coaches
German male handball players
People from Greifswald
Sportspeople from Mecklenburg-Western Pomerania